Sir John Percival Vissing Madsen FAA (24 March 1879 – 4 October 1969) was an Australian academic, physicist, engineer, mathematician and Army officer.

This history of Madsen's activities in Australian science & engineering covers the period 1900–1956 during which applications of electricity, X-ray analysis, standardised measurements for production, radio propagation, radar & radio astronomy, nuclear physics & digital computers made tremendous progress in part due to major advances in fundamental research & also the heightened activity due to two world wars. Central to these activities largely carried out at Sydney University, was the Electrical Engineering Department & the CSIRO National Standards Laboratory/ Radiophysics Laboratory (now The Madsen Building  in the University grounds.

Madsen's roles encompassed the positions of Lecturer, Assistant Professor, Professor & Emeritus Professor from 1909 up to 1956 when he finally retired as Chairman of the Radio Research Board which he founded in 1927. Until 1946 Madsen was the first and only Professor of Electrical Engineering in any Australian University.

1900–1911 
Madsen (1879-1969) graduated from Sydney University with first class honours & University Medals in both Science & Engineering in 1900 & then 1901 when he read physics & mathematics establishing the practice of taking the double degree of BSc & BE & he himself embarking on a lifelong career of applying physics to the foundations of engineering. 

In 1901 he was appointed Lecturer in physics & mathematics at the University of Adelaide under W H Bragg with whom he established a close association over many years & this soon led in 1902 to the opportunity to become the first Lecturer in Electrical Engineering at the University. In the latter part of 1902 during a period of leave of absence & at his own expense he proceeded on a tour through England & America to gain information on the most recent methods of instruction in Electrical Engineering adopted by the Universities & Higher technical Colleges & at the same time visiting as many as possible of the most important installations and manufacturing businesses. He found that the general type of course was much the same throughout consisting of groundwork in mathematics, physics & chemistry where courses were over three or four years with the specialisation in Electric Engineering taking place during the latter portion. A thesis dealing with some approved portion of work & written up during the vacations was also required from the student & on completion of the course the recognised practice for these men was to take up employment with a reputable manufacturing firm. Experience gained in this way was most essential as men are put through all the departments after which they stay in the one in which they intend to specialise dealing at that time with the further subdivision of Direct & Continuous current. The equipment for teaching in England was considered sufficient for teaching being of small size & less expensive whereas in America there was a tendency towards using large machines with large currents & high EMFs where the methods of handling are considerably different. In the case of smaller plant more responsibility can be taken by a student & this assists the student in gaining confidence in the handling of experiments. On completion of the degree the graduate was accepted by the IEE as sufficient qualification for their associateship & then it became most essential to obtain experience on the Continent, England or America before taking up a permanent position. From time to time openings in large manufacturing works in America, England & Germany became available for graduates.

Commencing in 1905 Sydney University was to appoint its first Lecturer in Electrical Engineering & JPVM applied wishing to get married & be employed back at Sydney University. WHB wrote a very favourable testimonial & concluded that he would be very sorry if it assists JPVM's departure from Adelaide. The Chancellor of the University of Adelaide also expressed great regret at the possibility of JPVM leaving Adelaide & referred to his ability as an able & hard working man of unimpeachable character who had proved himself a successful teacher & Lecturer inspiring his students with his own enthusiasm. E. Kilman Scott from England however was given the appointment for four years & so in fact JPVM did remain in Adelaide for the next four years & in conjunction with his Electrical Engineering duties embarked on a period of fundamental research in physics with WHB.

WHB had greatly improved his skills in giving public lectures & science demonstrations during his time in Adelaide but at the relatively old age of 42 was inspired by Rutherford's work to give a Presidential address to the AAAS meeting to be held in Dunedin in 1904 which set out his research ideas on the ionization of gases. The discovery of X-rays by Rontgen in 1895, radium in 1898 by the Curies & the electron by J J Thomson in 1897 had created fertile ground for research work in physics which WHB then started to devise experiments & at the same time develop theoretical ideas to support his results. In 1905 JPVM joined with WHB in his experiments & then later publishing his own experiments up to 1909, & in particular a paper on the Scattering of Beta Rays of Radium published in England in the Phil Mag. One of the results of great significance from this experiment with thin foils of gold, aluminium, silver & paper was that for the thinnest of foils the beta particles passing through were only scattered once, the implication to Rutherford of this was that within the atom there was a lot of empty space. Rutherford in 1911 published a very famous paper on the Scattering of Alpha & Beta particles & the Structure of the Atom the Rutherford Model as a mini solar system or nuclear atom in which he mentions Madsen's results. JPVM also wrote to Nature on matters arising from his experiments which he considered to be of significance.

In 1909 WHB and family departed Adelaide for England and Madsen returned to Sydney University with his family and in an effort to keep JPVM abreast of research mainly in England & Germany, WHB wrote lengthy letters from Leeds also making arrangements for a new large & very expensive supply of Radium from Braunschweig funded to JPVM by a wealthy tobacco merchant. W H Bragg & J P V Madsen Collaboration and Correspondence. It is not known what further experiment Madsen was working on in Sydney with his new supply of Radium however the results were not as expected & when finished he passed the Radium on to Royal Prince Alfred Hospital for medical use. In 1912 W H B published a book "Studies in Radioactivity" in which he gives a full account of JPVM's Beta Scattering apparatus with an Ionization chamber & also his results for Aluminium & Gold foils. In late 1912 WHB also invented his X-ray ionization diffraction spectrometer which also involved the electronic measurement of scattered wave material having passed through crystals which contributed significantly to his receipt, with son Lawrence W L Bragg, of the 1915 Nobel Prize in physics.

1912–1918 
In May 1912 in a President's Address to the University of Sydney Engineering Society JPVM set out his ideas on the effective manner in which Engineers should be trained. He believed teaching of engineering was more than just technical matters & to his mind included character, clearness of thought & expression, general knowledge, tastes, discipline & contact with men of vastly different interests. There should be a liberal arrangement of the syllabus by doing away with individual years & place only a minimum limit of four years on the course so that the student can take as long as he pleased with certain essential subjects leaving a certain number as options. He did not believe that the Matriculation test in languages & literature was essential for entrance to an Engineering course. The course of instruction needs to be geared to Australian needs with more emphasis on applications compared to finer points of design. A sound quantitative knowledge of portions of science which directly concern his professional work should be provided. The system of training is to consist of a clear exposition of the fundamental principles of science & then a study of the methods of application of these principles. As soon as the principles are understood in a general way then he must be then shown the practical application-there is a tendency to remember the applications & forget the principles. Such a defect can arise if students are given principles in one course & it is then left for him to deal with applications at a later stage. There is also a need for short graduate courses of 6-10 lectures. The need for an Australian physical Measurements Laboratory such as in Germany, London, Washington & Japan was raised at this time.

In 1914 in his Presidential Address to the Electrical Association of NSW JPVM again raised the need for Australia to participate in international comparisons of physical measurements & pointed to the role in Germany where the Physicalische Reichsansalt had become a very important institution. In conclusion JPVM referred to the loss of service due to the death of George Westinghouse one of the pioneers of the electrical industry.

At the outbreak of WW1 Madsen had been Captain of the Sydney University Rifle club & although he volunteered for active service was retained as the Chief Instructor & Officer Commanding the Commonwealth Engineer Officers Training School at Moore Park & then Roseville. The trainees at the School were all selected men with high engineering qualifications & courses of instruction were adapted to suit the requirements of these men. He was a tiger for physical fitness & maintained a mixture of hard discipline during work periods & at other times a smiling ease & warm friendliness.

Beyond 1914 – The University of Sydney and the Great War

1920–1938 
In 1920 Madsen was appointed to the Chair of Electrical Engineering at Sydney University and until 1946 remained the only professor of Electrical Engineering in an Australian University. In the Engineering Year Book of 1926 it was noted by students that it was the beginning of Third Year that they met Madsen and his subject of Electrical Engineering & his untiring energy is what really instilled in our minds the true idea of efficient work. His lectures are more effective than any others we get, due probably to his clear and concise idea of the usual pitfalls for young students of electricity & the saving grace of first principles as opposed to details. To him alone, we owe whatever slight conception we have of the importance of filthy lucre & "corsts" in engineering undertakings.

In 1926 the Council for Scientific Research- CSIR- was formed by Stanley Bruce the Australian Prime Minister. That same year public submissions were called to consider which areas of research should be followed. Madsen made two submissions on the same day at the hearings in Melbourne, the first dealing with the establishment of an Australian Radio Research Board and then the establishment of a National Standards Laboratory. All the other submissions which were made were for primary industry programmes. The proposal to form the Australian RRB was adopted at this time to be funded by CSIR, the Department of Defence & the PMG & to work on similar lines to the British RRB under Robert Watson Watt. In 1926 many of the techniques of radio propagation were still unknown & the development of long distant communication & broadcasting were still empirical, however in Britain and the United States of America a more fundamental scientific approach was evolving with spectacular results. At this time in Australia problems limiting full use of the medium were assuming importance in Australia. As Chairman of the newly formed RRB JPVM travelled overseas to America where he attended an URSI-International Union of Radio Science conference in Washington & then to Britain & the continent obtaining relevant information on Radio Research & also Standards Laboratories even though that proposal was not to be taken up by CSIR until ten years later.  In London JPVM arranged a selection panel consisting of Rutherford, Appleton & Tizard to recommend three staff to be appointed for three year terms to come out to Sydney & Melbourne Universities to follow on from research programmes initiated in England on atmospherics & the ionosphere. Despite the economic stringencies of the Depression the work of the Board in both areas achieved worldwide recognition by 1935 & the valuable contributions made were provided freely. 

In 1935 Madsen delivered an address at the University of Queensland which gave a very thorough summary of the results of the RRB dealing with the Ionosphere & its Influence upon the propagation of radio waves & considered the effects explained by the Magneto-Ionic Theory. One of the first research workers of the RRB was J L Pawsey  who undertook a master's degree programme working with George Munro in Melbourne on atmospherics & after completing a
PhD in Cambridge under J A Ratcliffe  & working with EMI in England returned to Australia at the start of the war to work in Radiophysics on radar & others such as D F Martyn were similarly drawn in to form the nucleus of this vital work. In 1930 Sydney University commenced a course on Electrical Communications whose participants contributed to a growing electronics industry in Sydney.

In 1931 Madsen delivered a lecture to celebrate the life and work of Michael Faraday and the applications of his discovery of electro-magnetic induction. 

In 1937, in no small measure due to the concern of the expansion of Japan in East Asia and the Pacific Islands, a report of a Secondary Industries Testing Committee of which MAdsen was a member led to the setting up of a National Standards Laboratory within CSIR consisting of sections of Metrology, Physics and Electrotechnology. Sydney University agreed to the Laboratory being located in its grounds with MAdsen the Chairman of the overseeing Board. The information considered was found by MAdsen to be substantially the same as he had obtained ten years before including the facility used by Japan. Construction of the Laboratory did not commence until the latter part of 1939 & followed plans supplied by the National Physical Laboratory NPL Teddington. In 1928 in a paper to the Institution of Engineers JPVM referred to the practical difficulties of deriving from the absolute units of  centimetre, gramme & second units such as temperature, Candle-power & electrical units. At this time the wavelength of the red cadmium line was under investigation as a universal reference for length. The expensive auxiliary equipment needed to make comparisons was seen as being far more involved than just procuring standards or their copies. The use of slip gauges or block gauges was to become of great importance to NSL in 1939 when these gauges could not be obtained from England or America & had to be made by NSL.
In July 1937 Rutherford wrote to Madsen in part advising that: "My friend Wimperis is, I believe, visiting New Zealand and Australia shortly in connection with the Air Ministry. I hope you will have an opportunity of meeting him. He is a thoroughly sound fellow and a good friend of mine. We have played many a game of golf together". Harry Wimperis was closely involved with Henry Tizard in 1934 in initiating the British RDF (radar) effort as a means to defeat the expected bomber raids from Germany. Wimperis had been invited by the Australian Government to advise on setting up an Aeronautical industry in Australia as a defence measure & one result was that JPVM arranged for Sydney University to set up a chair in Aeronautical Engineering. In a private conversation with JPVM in Melbourne during this visit Wimperis tacitly acknowledged that Britain was working on a radio based method of detecting aircraft.

1939–1945 
Because of the possibility that Britain could be overrun by the Germans in the event of war, Britain decided in January 1939 to share its RDF secrets with Commonwealth Countries (Canada, Australia, New Zealand and South Africa). Once this information was conveyed to Australia Madsen as Chairman of the Radio Research Board drew up a Radiophysics plan for research & production arrangements for submission to the Australian Government.

[The Australian War Memorial   Histories of the Australian involvement with radar & standards in WW2 are dealt with comprehensively by David Mellor in the "Role of Science and Industry" series.]

In August 1939 at a meeting in Canberra with Prime Minister R G Menzies, David Rivett, Madsen, D F Martyn & senior Defence Staff, approval was given to build a Radiophysics Laboratory (RPL) in the Sydney University grounds as an extension of the NSL building then under construction so as to not draw attention to the nature of the secret  work to be undertaken. Madsen was appointed Chairman of the overseeing Radiophysics Advisory Board & was responsible for aligning the requirements of the services with the ideas & developments of the scientific staff. The RPL functioned as a Division of CSIR & its initial staff were appointed based on their previous RRB experience or experience in the fledgling radio industry firms of the previous decade and later as more scientists were needed they came directly from universities if they had high frequency experience.

Initially it was the Australian Army which showed greatest interest in radar for controlling shore or harbour defence guns whilst the air force was principally interested in airborne ASV radar. The valve requirements for these radars was the key & the VT90  valve producing 1.5 metre wavelength (200 mc/s) was used for pulse generation which provided great economy. The RPL development of aerial duplexing (i.e. the antennae acts both as transmitter & receiver) was based on the invention of a very fast & reliable transmit/receive switch by RPL staff.   In England in 1940 the invention of the resonant cavity magnetron by  Randall & Boot in the laboratory of Mark Oliphant, at wavelength of 10 cm revolutionised allied radar & was taken to America in August 1940 as part of the Tizard Mission. As an extension of 10 cm developments for Australia, JPVM arranged through R G Casey the new Australian ambassador in Washington for him to establish  a scientific liaison officer mainly to keep in contact with rapid developments at the Radiation Laboratory MIT & commercial firms involved such as Bell Labs. In return Australia was to assist US forces in radar matters when required which after commencement of hostilities with Japan became extremely urgent.

In August 1941 F W G White had initiated an air warning programme in Radiophysics. The main developments in Australian radar after Pearl Harbour involved the lightweight principle which was used in the design of the LW/AW (Lightweight Air Warning) set & the GCI (Ground Control Intercept) sets essential for operations in New Guinea & beyond in the SWPA theatre. The sudden fall of [Singapore-radar|Singapore] on 15 February 1942 created an even greater sense of urgency in providing air warning for vital Australian centres. JPVM resigned as Chairman of the RAB in July 1942 as he felt someone with more production experience was required rather than his research background but he attended all Board meetings until the end of the war. When Karl Compton  of OSRD visited Australia in 1944 particular mention was made that the Australian Operations Research Group had been set up on JPVM's  instigation based on information obtained by him from Patrick Blackett whilst in England. Near the end of the war Australian LW/AW radars in the hands of Macarthur's forces were slated to be used in Operation Olympic which was the plan in development to invade the three valleys of southern Kyushu in Japan. Australian developed Doppler radar would have been very useful in these conditions.

On 21 August 1945 shortly after the end of World War 2, Madsen was elected Chairman of the Australian National Research Council & a special subcommittee of five physicists including JPVM was formed to prepare recommendations to the Australian Government on the practical engineering applications that needed solution since the principle of liberation of atomic energy had now been discovered. Six recommendations were advised to Prime Minister J B Chifley on 3 December 1945 the first of which was that the Australian government should convey to the British Government the desire that Australia should play an appropriate part in plans which may be developed by the British government for further research in nuclear physics. A recommendation was made to secure control of uranium and thorium deposits & promote active search for new deposits & also that accredited physicists be sent from Australia to England to obtain necessary information or invite a senior member of the British Scientific team to visit Australia & advise the Commonwealth Government. J B Chifley replied in a letter of 14 February 1946 advising that the Government had already received substantially similar recommendations from CSIR & that action had been taken on the first two recommendations & that in due course a satisfactory programme concerning development of nuclear energy for industrial purposes in Australia would be developed.

1946–1956 
The Royal Society organised a three-week Empire Scientific Conference to be held in June–July 1946 with conferences in London, Oxford and Cambridge. Two further weeks were then arranged for more official government decision making. The delegates to the Royal Society Conference included UK (38), Canada (15), Australia (9), India (14), New Zealand (4), South Africa (7), West Indies (4), Southern Rhodesia (5) as well as Eire & East Africa. The 9 Australian delegates were led by David Rivett FRS of CSIR. & included JPVM who did not deliver any papers but did propose that a Secretariat be formed which would prepare the ground for the first meeting of a Commonwealth Standards body. The Conference was opened by H M The King on Monday 17 June at 11.00 am at the Beveridge Hall of the Senate House, University of London. The UK delegates, mainly FRS, included E Appleton, P M S Blackett, J Chadwick, Lord Cherwell ,  J D Cockcroft, C Darwin,& Henry Tizard.

Before the war ended Radiophysics in CSIR and the RRB were initiating programmes dealing with the upper atmosphere and operational RAAF radar stations were at times in their routines making recorded observations of atmospheric anomalies. J L Pawsey commenced work on radio astronomy and at the cessation of hostilities a vast supply of surplus radar equipment became available for use in this area.

In 1946 Trevor Pearcey-Csiropedia who had emigrated from Britain in late 1945 and joined Radiophysics started on a design of a stored programme digital computer and its construction in 1947–48 was financed in part at least by the recommendation of Madsen. In August 1951 a Conference on Automatic Computing Machines was held at Sydney University chaired by the now Emeritus Professor Sir John Madsen at which Douglas Hartree from England delivered papers in conjunction with David Myers from Sydney University on Analogue Computing and Trevor Pearcey on CSIR Mk1.& this was one of the first in the world to be displayed this way. The 1951 Conference is regarded as the start of a separate computing profession in Australia & the papers Proceedings of the Conference  whilst mainly technical, form the basis of work for decades to follow. A summary of the main discussions indicate by Madsen that up to this point computing had been considered to be a sub discipline of mathematics.

In recognition of the outstanding Australian radio work done in the previous 25 years the Xth General Assembly was held at Sydney University in August 1952. Madsen was Chairman of the Australian Organising Committee & was also elected President of the Xth Assembly. 

In 1956 there was great concern in the West that the Soviet Union had taken a significant lead in scientific training of its engineers following the  detonation of its hydrogen bomb soviet atomic bomb project & the soon to follow  Sputnik 1. To address the situation in Australia JPVM published a paper through Sydney University setting out recommendations for manpower requirements in the scientific era touching greatly on his own experience of the previous 50 years of promoting engineering with science. In the post war period to the end of the twentieth century there was a significant change in emerging technology policies moving from a mainly government sponsored "supply" side environment to a business orientated "demand" side market."

References

Fellows of the Australian Academy of Science
1879 births
1969 deaths
Australian physicists
Australian engineers
Australian mathematicians
Australian Army officers
Knights Bachelor